Texas Pacifico Transportation Ltd.  is a Class III railroad operating company in West Texas owned by Grupo México. The company operates over the South Orient Rail Line under a lease and operating agreement with the Texas Department of Transportation and  Texas Pacifico Transportation, Ltd.  The Texas Pacifico company began service in March 2001.

The South Orient Rail Line runs from San Angelo Junction (near Coleman, Texas) to the Mexican border town of Presidio, Texas. The line has been rehabilitated from San Angelo Junction through San Angelo and on to Alpine, Texas. Capital improvements are underway for the remaining Excepted track.

Texas Pacifico interchanges with BNSF Railway and Fort Worth and Western Railroad at San Angelo Junction and Union Pacific Railroad at Alpine. Traffic had been interchanged with Ferromex at Presidio over the Presidio–Ojinaga International Rail Bridge, but the bridge has been out of service following fire damage on 29 February 2008.  Service into Mexico over the repaired bridge is expected to resume after the U.S. Customs and Border Protection (CBP) inspection facility has been installed.

See also
 Ferromex the rail line in Mexico that Texas Pacifico Transportation connects with at Presidio
 Kansas City, Mexico and Orient Railway original builder of the line on which Texas Pacifico Transportation operates

Further reading

References

Texas railroads
Regional railroads in the United States
Railway companies established in 2005